Trosos De Guadalupe is a municipality in the Sonsonate department of El Salvador.

Populated places in El Salvador